The Barrie Police Service (BPS) is the police service of the city of Barrie, Ontario, Canada. It is made up of 218 police personnel and 94 civilians that serve a population of 135,711, as of 2011, in an area covering .

The chief of police is the highest-ranking officer of the Barrie Police Service. The current chief is Rich Johnston.

History

The Barrie Police Service is the third-oldest police force still in existence in Ontario, after the Kingston Police Service (1841) and the Hamilton Police Service (1833).

Past police chiefs 
 Rich Johnston, 2022-present
 Kimberley Greenwood, 2013–2022
 Mark Neelin, 2010–2013
 Wayne Frechette, 2000–2010
 Jack Delcourt, 1985–2000
 Earl Snider, 1976–1985
 Ed Tschirhart, 1956–1976 - former with Kitchener force
 OPP contract, 1946–1956
 H.H. Peel, Barrie Detachment Commander Sergeant
 Morley Wright - Detachment Commander Sergeant
 James Case, acting chief, 1946
 B.B. Burtchael, 1945
 Alexander Stewart, 1924–1945
 James Case, 1923–1924
 Robert King, 1888–1923
 Chief Constable Joseph Rogers, 1853–1888

Controversies
In 2008 a senior police inspector in charge of the Barrie Police Service Professional Standards Branch was relieved of his duties after emailing a racist joke to colleagues.
In 2009 an attempted obstruction of justice was reported after senior Barrie Police Service officials initially failed to disclose and then subsequently refused to disclose the existence of criminal charges against one of their constables, which included, drug possession and trafficking, cocaine use while on duty, theft (stealing money and phone cards from an evidence bag), and obstruction of justice.
In 2010 a Barrie police constable, Jason Nevill, assaulted and arrested a man under false charges. After the incident was caught on a security camera and caused public outcry, he was later found guilty of causing bodily harm, unlawful use of authority and obstruction of evidence. Following a one-year jail sentence, Nevill resigned from the police force.
In 2021 the Ontario Provincial Police opened an investigation into the violent arrest of a 20-year-old skateboarder by Barrie police officers after video of the incident was shared on social media.

See also
 Integrated Security Unit

References

External links
 Barrie Police website

1853 establishments in Canada
Law enforcement agencies of Ontario
Municipal government of Barrie
Organizations established in 1853